The 2020 U Sports Men's Volleyball Championship was scheduled to be held March 13–15, 2020, in Winnipeg, Manitoba, to determine a national champion for the 2019–20 U Sports men's volleyball season. The tournament was cancelled on the first day that games were scheduled to be played due to the COVID-19 pandemic in Canada. This was the first time that a national championship had not been played since it was first contested in 1967.

The tournament was scheduled to be played at Investors Group Athletic Centre at the University of Manitoba. It would have been the second time that Manitoba had hosted the tournament with the most recent occurring in 1978. This also would have been the last set of games for long-time Bisons head coach, Garth Pischke, who retired following this season after 36 years with Manitoba.

Participating teams

Championship bracket

Consolation bracket

References

External links 
 Tournament Web Site

U Sports volleyball
2020 in men's volleyball
University of Manitoba
Usports Men's Volleyball Championship, 2020